al-Qasr wa as-Sayyad is a village in Nag Hammadi district of Qena Governorate, Egypt. 

An early center of Christianity in the Thebaid, Roman Egypt, a site frequented by Desert Fathers from the 3rd century and the site of a monastery from the 4th, it was earlier known as Chenoboskion (Greek  "geese pasture"), also called Chenoboscium , Chenoboskia and Sheneset. 

The Nag Hammadi library, a collection of 2nd-century Gnostic manuscripts discovered in 1945, was found in the Nile cliffs to the north-west.

History

At Chenoboskion, St Pachomius was converted to Christianity in the 4th century. Pachomius retreated to this place, having ceased his military activity sometime around 310-315 (the approximate figure given is 314), and converted to Christianity whilst dwelling in the desert.
There is a monastery located at Chenoboskion that is dedicated to St Pachomius.

People moved to the region to be near Saint Anthony the Great. A monastic community formed around the saint for the purpose of spiritual guidance, beginning in Pispir and from there moving eastward. The mountainous area east of Pispir is the place of the present Monastery of Saint Anthony. The settlement of Chenoboskion created from this eastward movement began in the Thebaid.

See also
Antoninus Pius
Tabenna
Cenobitic monasticism

References

Further reading
 Palmer, William  archive.org Egyptian chronicles : with a harmony of sacred and Egyptian chronology, and an appendix on Babylonian and Assyrian antiquities (1861)  [Retrieved  2011-09-27]
 Robert North   books.google.com Chenoboskion and Q  [Retrieved  2011-09-27]
  Elaine Pagels pac.nwrls.lib.fl.us  The gnostic gospels [Retrieved  2011-09-27]
 David M. Scholer   books.google.co.uk Nag Hammadi Bibliography, 1948-1969 this link shows a list of books,those numbered 1259,1358,1419,1420,1424,1425,1441,1442,1445,1463,1464, relate to historical significance of this settlement [Retrieved  2011-09-27]

History of Christianity in Egypt
Populated places in Qena Governorate